This article lists modern armoured fighting vehicles (AFVs) produced or used after the Second World War.

Argentina 
AFVs produced in Argentina
 TAM
 VCTP
 Patagón

Australia 
AFVs produced in Australia

Wheeled armoured fighting vehicles 
 ASLAV (Australian LAV-25 series)
Boxer AFV

Armoured personnel carriers 
 M113 Armored Personnel Carrier (modifications only)
 Bushmaster IMV

Austria 
AFVs produced in Austria
 Saurer 4K 4FA series (Schützenpanzer A1)
 Steyr 4K 7FA
 SPz Ulan – co-development with Spain ("ASCOD").
 Pandur I 6x6
 Pandur II 6x6 and 8x8
 SK-105 Kürassier

Azerbaijan 
AFVs produced in Azerbaijan
 Matador 4x4 (Mine Resistant Ambush Protected vehicle)
 Marauder 4x4 (Mine Resistant Ambush Protected vehicle)
 Gurza pickup Patrol (based on Toyota Hilux)
 BTR-70 8x8 Shimshek-23 mm(Armoured Personnel Carrier)
 BTR-82A 8x8 30 mm(Armoured Personnel Carrier)

Belgium 
AFVs produced in Belgium
BDX (APC)
 Cobra series
 SIBMAS
 FN 4RM-62F AB

Belarus 
AFVs produced in Belarus
 2T Stalker

Brazil 
AFVs produced in Brazil

Armoured personnel carrier 
 EE-3 Jararaca
 EE-9 Cascavel
 EE-11 Urutu
VBTP-MR Guarani

Infantry fighting vehicles 

 VBTP-Charrua

 EE-T4 Ogum
 FNM Cutia

Main Battle Tank 
 EE-T1 Osório
 Bernardini MB-3 Tamoyo
 X1A2

Self-propelled artillery 
 Astros II MLRS multiple rocket launcher

4×4 Armored car 
 VBPED 4×4 CTEx light armoured car
 Marruá M27 VPBL Agrale/OTT 4×4 light armored car
 GUARÁ Avibrás 4×4 light armored car
 VBL Gladiador 4×4 light armored car
 AV-VU4 AM medium 4×4 armored car
 AV-VBL Heavy 4×4 armored car

Others 
 EE-17 Sucuri
 EE-18 Sucuri II

Bulgaria 
AFVs produced in Bulgaria
 BMP-23
 Tundzha self-propelled mortar (tracked, 120 mm)
 Podnos self-propelled mortar (tracked, 82 mm)
 MT-LB versions
 BTR-60PB-MD1

Canada 
AFVs produced in Canada
 LAV family of wheeled armoured vehicles:
 AVGP: Cougar, Grizzly and Husky 6×6 armoured vehicles - based on the MOWAG Piranha
 LAV-25 8×8 – Family of vehicles produced for the United States Marine Corps
 Bison APC 8×8
 Coyote Reconnaissance Vehicle 8×8
 ASLAV 8×8 – Family of vehicles produced for the Australian Army based on the LAV-25 and Bison vehicles
 LAV III 8×8
 Stryker 8×8 – Co-produced in the United States for the United States Army
 Air Defense Anti-Tank System (ADATS)
 Multi-Mission Effects Vehicle (MMEV) (Project canceled)

Chile 
AFVs produced in Chile
 Piraña 6×6
 Piraña 8×8
 VTP-1 Orca
 VTP-2 Escarabajo

China 
Modern armoured fighting vehicles produced in the People's Republic of China.

Tanks
Type 99 tank
Type 96 tank
Type 15 tank
VT-4

Infantry fighting vehicles 
 Type 92 aka WZ551 wheeled IFV (Modern)
 ZBD-03 aka WZ-506, tracked dedicated airborne IFV (Modern)
 ZBD-04 tracked semi-amphibious IFV (Modern)
 ZBD-05, tracked dedicated amphibious IFV (Modern)
 ZBL-08, family of wheeled vehicles including IFV, APC (Modern)

Colombia 
AFVs produced in Colombia
 BTR-80 Caribe
 Hunter TR-12

Croatia 
AFVs produced in Croatia
 M-84
 M-95 Degman
 LOV
 LOV-1

Egypt

Tanks 
 Ramses-II main battle tank
 T-62 
 M60 Patton
 M1A1 Abrams (locally produced)

Armoured fighting vehicles 
 EIFV (Egyptian AIFV variant of the M113, locally built)
 AIFV YPR-765 PRI, European version of the American AIFV equipped with the 25 mm KBA-B02 turret
 Fahd 280-30

Armoured cars 
 Fahd (armored personnel carrier) 
 Walid (armored personnel carrier) 
 Tiger Kader-120  4×4 Armored reconnaissance scout (locally built)
 M113
 BTR-50 
 OT-62 TOPAS 
 Pegaso BMR 
 OT-64 SKOT 
 BTR-60 
 BTR-152 
 RG-32 Scout 
 Humvee 
 Panthera 
 Nimr  (Appeared for the first time during the 42nd anniversary of the 1973 Arab-Israeli war) 
 Casspir 
 RSherpa Light
 Land Rover Tangi 
 BTR-40 (230)
 Cadillac Gage Commando 
 BRDM-2 
 BAE Caiman 
 RG-33 
 International MaxxPro

Finland 
AFVs produced in Finland
 Sisu Pasi (XA-180, -185, -202, -203)
 Patria AMV
 Patria 6×6

France 

AFVs produced in France

Tanks 
 ARL 44
 AMX 13
 AMX 30 
 Leclerc

Armoured cars 
 AMX 10 RC 
 VBC-90
 Panhard EBR 
 Panhard AML
 Panhard ERC
 VBL 
 Vextra 105
 Nexter Aravis 
 Petit Véhicule Protégé

Armoured personnel carriers 
 AMX-10P 
 VAB 
 VXB
 Panhard M3
 Panhard VCR
 VBCI

Self-propelled artillery 
 GCT 155mm
 CAESAR self-propelled howitzer

Georgia

Fast attack vehicles 
 DELGA-1 series

Armoured personnel carriers 
 Didgori-1
 Didgori-2
 Didgori-3
 TAAV

Infantry fighting vehicle 
 Lazika

Self-propelled artillery 
 ZCRS-122

Germany 
AFVs produced in Germany

Tanks 
 Leopard 1
 Leopard 2 
 VT tank
 H-400 – Design similar to the Mowag Piranha

Self-propelled artillery 
 PzH 2000 
 LARS 1 & 2
 MARS

Self-propelled anti-aircraft artillery 
 Flugabwehrkanonenpanzer Gepard
 Roland (missile)

Tank destroyers 
 Kanonenjagdpanzer
 Raketenjagdpanzer 1
 Raketenjagdpanzer 2
 RakJPz 3 Jaguar 1 (HOT)
 RakJPz 4 Jaguar 2 (TOW)

Infantry fighting vehicles 
 Marder 1 
 Puma
 Lynx

Reconnaissance vehicle 
 Luchs
 Fennek replacing the Luchs
 TH200 (prototype only)

Armoured personnel carriers 
 TPz Fuchs 1
 GTK Boxer (MRAV)
 Thyssen Henschel UR-416

Bridge layers 
 Biber
 Panzerschnellbrücke 2

Other AFVs 
 Wiesel 1 & 2
 Dachs
 Kodiak
 Büffel
 Skorpion
 Keiler
 ATF Dingo
 AGF Serval
 Mungo ESK
 Duro 3
 Grizzly
 YAK

Greece 
AFVs produced in Greece

Tanks 
 Leopard 2A6 HEL

Infantry carriers 
 ELBO Leonidas-1 (Copy of the Steyr 4K 7FA)
 ELBO Leonidas-2
 ELBO Kentaurus

Wheeled armoured vehicles 
 Namco Tiger Armored Vehicle (proposed)
 EODH Hoplite

Hungary 
AFVs produced in Hungary

Armoured fighting vehicles 
 Lynx Infantry Fighting Vehicle

Wheeled armoured vehicles 

 Gidrán 4x4 MRAP

India 
AFVs produced in India

Tanks 
 Arjun MBT 
Arjun Mk 1A 
 T-90S Bhishma MBT (2011)
 T-72M1 Combat Improved Ajeya MBT
 T-55A MBT (reserve)
 Vijayanta MBT (retired)
 Tank-EX Prototype MBT
 BMP-2 105 mm Light Tank Prototype

Armoured fighting vehicles 
 BMP-2 Sarath Infantry Fighting Vehicle
 Nag Missile Carrier Namica tank destroyer
 Abhay IFV

Armoured carrier 
 TATA Kestrel
Mahindra Armored Light Specialist Vehicle
Kalyani M4
 Tarmour Heavy APC
 Aditya MPV|Aditya mine protected personnel carrier
 Takshak Light armoured vehicle
 Abhay IFV

Self-propelled artillery 
 Bhim SPA
 M-46 Catapult
K9 VAJRA T (Enhanced version of HTW’s K9 Thunder made for Indian Army which outperformed its Russian competitorthe Russian self-propelled 2S19 Msta-S howitzer)

Indonesia 
AFVs produced in Indonesia

Tank 

 Pindad Harimau

Fire support vehicle 

 Pindad Badak

APCs 
 Pindad Anoa
 Pindad APR-1V
 Pindad Komodo
  Pindad Cobra
ILSV
TAD Turangga

Iran 
AFVs produced in Iran

Tanks
 Karrar MBT
 Zulfiqar 1 MBT
 Zulfiqar 2 MBT (Prototype)
 Zulfiqar 3 MBT
 Type 72Z Medium tank
 Tiam Medium tank
 T-72M Rakhsh T-72M variant developed by the IRGC with new ERA, sights, an RWS. and many other upgrades.
 T-72S MBT (under license)
 Tosan light tank

Tank destroyers
 Aqareb Wheeled 8x8 Tank Destroyer
 Pirooz on ARAS 4x4

Infantry fighting vehicles
 Makran IFV
 Cobra BMT-2 Boragh with either a 30mm Shipunov 2A42 auto-cannon or a ZU-23-2
 BMP-1 APC (under license)
 BMP-2 APC (under license)

Armoured personal carriers
 Sayyad AFV 
 Boragh APC
 Rakhsh 4x4 APC
 Sarir 4x4 APC
 Hoveyzeh Tracked light vehicle
 BPR-82 Sedad 23mm BTR-60PB with an unmanned ZU-23-2.
 Heidar-6 BTR-60PB with a 2A28 Grom and a new engine.
 Heidar-7 BTR-60PB with unmanned 23mm turret, ERA, and a new engine.

Infantry Mobility Vehicles
 Toofan 4x4 IMV
 Ra'ad 6x6 IMV
 Roueintan 4x4 IMV
 Fateq 4x4 IMV

Self-propelled artillery
 Raad-1 Self-propelled artillery
 Raad-2 Self-propelled artillery
 Heidar-41 122mm truck based self-propelled artillery.
 HM-41 Truck based automatic loading version

Iraq

Tanks 
 Lion of Babylon tank

Ireland 

 BDX 
 FV101 Scorpion 440
 Mowag Piranha IIIH
 Sisu XA-180
 RG-32M Light Tactical Vehicle

Israel

Tanks 
 Isherman (upgraded M4 Sherman tank)
 Sho't (upgraded Centurion tank)
 Magach (upgraded M60 and M48 Patton))
··((Magach 3: Modernized M48A1/A2C/A3. ))
··((Magach 5: M48A5 in the original configuration. Generally similar to the Magach 3, but had slightly different engine and transmission—AVDS-1790-2D and CD-850-6A accordingly. They were eventually fitted with Blazer ER))
··((Magach 6: Modernized M60A1 or M60A3.))
··((Magach 7: M60 with more upgrades))
 Sabra (upgraded M60 Patton tank)
 Merkava tank
 Merkava Mk 1
 Merkava Mk 2
 Merkava Mk 3 (Ramaqh and Baz)
 Merkava Mk 4 and Mk 4M Windbreaker

Armoured personnel carriers 
 IDF Nagmachon APC (based on Centurion chassis)
 IDF Nakpadon APC (based on Centurion chassis)
 IDF Achzarit APC (based on T-54/55 chassis)
 IDF Namer IFV (based on Merkava chassis)
 Wolf Armoured Vehicle
 Golan Armored Vehicle
 Eitan AFV ( To replace the Namer and M113 apcs )

Self-propelled artillery 
 L-33/39 Ro'em self-propelled howitzer (based on M4 Sherman chassis)
 Makmat self-propelled mortar (based on M4 Sherman chassis)
 MAR-290 rocket artillery launcher (based on M4 Sherman chassis)
 Sholef self-propelled howitzer (based on Merkava chassis)
 Rascal self-propelled howitzer

Combat engineering vehicles 
 IDF Caterpillar D9 armored bulldozer
 IDF Puma CEV (based on Centurion chassis)
 IDF Nammer CEV (based on Merkava chassis)
 Nemmera ARV (based on Merkava chassis)

Italy 
AFVs produced in Italy

Main battle tanks 
 OF-40
 Ariete

Infantry fighting vehicles 
 VCC-1 „Camillino“
 VCC-2
 VCC-80 Dardo

Armoured personnel carriers 
 Bv206S
 LVTP7/AAVP7A1 Amphibious Armored Vehicle (35- bought from the USA, locally upgraded)

Self-propelled air defence 
 SIDAM 25

Wheeled armoured vehicles 
 Centauro Wheeled Tank Destroyer
 VBM Freccia – Infantry Fighting Variant of the Centauro
 MAV 5 Armoured Personnel Carrier
 VTMM Orso 4x4
 VBL Puma 4×4
 VBL Puma 6×6
 VTML Lince

Self-propelled artillery 
 PzH 2000
 M270 MLRS

Observation vehicles 
 Fiat 6614G 4×4

Japan 
AFVs produced in Japan

Main battle tanks 
 Type 61
 Type 74 
 Type 90 
 Type 10

Infantry fighting vehicles 
 Type 89

Armored personnel carriers 
 Type 60
 Type 73
 Type 96 
 AAV7A1 
 Bushmaster 
 Type 82 Command Vehicle

Self-propelled artillery 
 Type 74 
 Type 75
 Type 99 
 M110A2 (91)
 Type 60 81 mm mortar
 Type 60 107 mm mortar 
 Type 96 120 mm mortar 
 Type 75 Rocket Launcher 
 M270 MLRS
 Type 19 155 mm Wheeled Self-propelled Howitzer

Self-propelled air defence 
 Type 87

Tank destroyers 
 Type 60 
 Type 16 Maneuver Combat Vehicle

Reconnaissance vehicle 
 Type 87

Other AFVs 
 Type 73 artillery tractor

Malaysia 
AFVs produced in Malaysia

Tracked armoured fighting vehicle 
 ACV-300

Wheeled armoured fighting vehicle 
 DefTech AV8

Wheeled armoured personnel carrier / Mine-resistant ambush protected (MRAP) 
 DefTech AV4
 Mildef HMAV 4x4

Myanmar
Armoured Vehicle producing in Myanmar.

Tanks

 MALT(Myanmar Army Light Tank):105 mm Light tank based on 2S1U chassis.

Infantry Fighting Vehicles

 BAAC-73 :(4x4)Infantry Fighting Vehicle.
 BAAC-83 :(4x4)Infantry Fighting Vehicle. 
 BAAC-84 :(4x4)Infantry Fighting Vehicle.
 BAAC-85 :(4x4)Infantry Fighting Vehicle.
 BAAC-86 :(4x4)Infantry Fighting Vehicle.
 BAAC-87 :(4x4)Infantry Fighting Vehicle.

Armoured Personnel Carriers

 ULARV-1 :(4x4)Armoured Personnel Carrier with a 14.5 mm machine gun.
 ULARV-2 :(4x4)Armoured Personnel Carrier with a 14.5 mm machine gun and a short range Igla turret.
 ULARV-3(Prototype) :(6x6)Armoured Personnel Carrier with a RCWS.

Army Scout Vehicle

 MAV-1 :(4 x 4)Light Armoured Vehicle.
 MAV-2 :(4 x 4)Light Armoured Vehicle.
 MAV-3 :(4 x 4)Light Armoured Vehicle.
 MAV-4 :(4 x 4)Light Armoured Vehicle.
 Naung Yoe Jeep :(4 x 4)Armoured Jeep.
 Inlay Jeep:(4 x 4)Armoured Jeep.

Armoured Air-defence Vehicle

 MADV-1 :(4 x 4)Armoured Air-defence Vehicle based on locally made Naung Yoe Armoured Jeep.
 MADV-2 :(4 x 4)Armoured Air-defence Vehicle based on locally made MAV-1 Light Armoured Vehicle.

Netherlands 
AFVs produced in the Netherlands

Tanks 
 Leopard 2A6

Armoured fighting vehicles 
 Combat Vehicle 90
 YPR-765 series

Armoured personnel carriers 
 DAF YP-408
 Sisu XA-188
 YPR-765 series
 Fennek
 Boxer MRAV
 Tpz Fuchs 1 Eloka
 Bushmaster IMV

North Korea 
AFVs produced in North Korea

Tanks 
 Chonma-ho
 Pokpung-ho
 M2020
 PT-85

Infantry fighting vehicles andArmoured personnel carriers 
 M-2012
 M-2010
 8×8 APC
 VTT-323
 Model 2009
 M1992

Self-propelled guns 
 M-1978 170mm SP
 M-1974 152mm SP
 M-1975 130mm SP
 M-1992 130mm SP
 M-1977 122mm SP
 M-1981 122mm SP
 M-1991 122mm SP
 M-1992 120mm SP

Norway 
AFVs produced in Norway

Main Battle Tanks 
 Leopard 1 A5NO
 Leopard 2 A4

Light Tanks 
 NM-116

Infantry Fighting Vehicles 
 CV9030N

Armoured personnel carrier 
 Sisu Pasi
 Bv 206
 M113 Modernised

Self-propelled artillery 
 M109A3NG
 M270 MLRS

Pakistan

Main battle tanks (MBT) 
 Al-Khalid
 Al Khalid-1 (AK-1)
 Al-Khalid-2 (AK-2) - (Under Development) 
 Al-Zarrar – MBT 
 Type-85IIAP/T-85UG - Pakistan specific T-85IIAP variants were license made at HIT and were later upgraded to T-85UG standards.
 Type 69 - T-69IIMP variants were license made in Pakistan.

Armoured Recovery Vehicles (ACRV) 
 Type 84 - W653 variant was license made at HIT

Infantry Fighting Vehicles (IFV) 
 Hamza IFV -

Special Operations Vehicles (SOV) 
 Predator SOV -

Multirole Combat Vehicles (MCV) 
 Hamza 8x8 - 
 Hamza 6x6 - 
 Hamza 6x6 Mk.2 -

Armoured personnel carriers (APC) 
 ASV Dragoon - License made at HIT
 Interceptor 4x4 B6 - ASV
 Interceptor 4x4 B7 - ASV
 Mohafiz - internal security vehicle
 M-113 - License made domestic variants
 APC Talha – armoured personnel carrier
 Al-Hadeed - Armoured Recovery Vehicle 
 Al-Qaswa – armoured logistics vehicle 
 Sakb – Armoured Command Vehicle
 Protector - ASV

Self propelled guns (SPG) 
 M109 - M-109A2 SPG License made at HIT

Poland 
AFVs produced in Poland

Tanks 
 PT-91 "Twardy" – modern tank based on T-72
 T-72M
 PT-94 "Goryl" – prototype/experimental
Leopard 2PL – modern tank based on Leopard 2

Tracked armoured personnel carriers and infantry fighting vehicles 
 IFV Borsuk – first production batch, in testing
 WPB Anders – prototype, cancelled 
 BWP-2000 – prototype/experimental, cancelled 
 BWP "Puma" E8 – modernized BMP
 BWP "Puma" RCWS-30 – modernized BMP
 BWP-1 series Infantry fighting vehicle
 SPG Kalina series
 OT-62 TOPAS series
 Opal series
 MT-LB series

Wheeled armoured personnel carriers and infantry fighting vehicles 
 KTO Rosomak – Licensed version of Patria Advanced Modular Vehicle
 KTO Ryś – 8x8 APC based on the SKOT APC
 KTO Irbis – 6x6 variant of KTO "Ryś"
 OT-64 SKOT

Armoured cars 
 Dzik
 Jenot
 Honker 2000
 Tur

Self-propelled artillery 
 2S1 "Goździk" – (pl. Carnation) 122 mm howitzer using MT-LB chassis, licensed copy of soviet design
 AHS Krab – 155 mm howitzer, a modern tracked system
 PZA "Loara" – AA system based on a PT-91 chassis, withdrawn from service
 Poprad
 Hibernyt - ZU-23-2 cannon mounted on Star 266 truck
 M120 Rak - 120mm mortar

Portugal 
AFVs produced in Portugal

Wheeled armoured fighting vehicles 
 Commando MK III APC
 Chaimite
 Pandur 8X8 APC – manufactured in Barreiro, under licence

Main battle tanks 
 M60A3
 Leopard 2

Romania 
AFVs produced in Romania

Tanks 
 TR-580
 TR-85
 TR-85 M1 Bizonul

Armoured personnel carriers 
 TAB-71
 TAB-77
 Zimbru
 TABC-79
 Saur 1
 Saur 2
 MLVM

Infantry fighting vehicles 
 MLI-84
 MLI-84M Jderul

Self-propelled artillery 
 Model 89
 ATROM

Russia 
AFVs produced in Russia

Tanks 
 Black Eagle Tank (cancelled)
 T-72
 T-80
 T-90
 T-95 (cancelled)
 T-14 Armata

Armoured personnel carriers 
 BTR-80
 BTR-90
 SBA-60K2 Bulat
 BPM-97
 Ural Typhoon
 Kamaz Typhoon
 Kurganets-25

Infantry fighting vehicles 
 BMP-3
 BMD-4
 T-15 Armata

Tank destroyers 
 Kornet-D

Self-propelled artillery 
 2S3 Akatsiya
 2S31 Vena
 2S19 Msta
 2S35 Koalitsiya-SV

Self-propelled air defense 
 9K35 Strela-10
 S-300 missile system
 Buk missile system
 Tor missile system

Serbia 
AFVs produced in Serbia

Tanks 
 M-84AS

Armoured personnel carriers 
 BOV M11
 BOV M16 Milos
 Lazar 2

Infantry fighting vehicles 
 BVP M-80AB1
 Lazar 3

Combat engineering vehicles 
 VIU-55 Munja

Singapore 
AFVs produced in Singapore

Tanks 
 Leopard 2SG

Armoured fighting vehicles 
 AMX-10P PAC90 and other versions
 M113 Modernised with 25 mm Bushmaster or 40 mm AGL
 Bionix AFV 28-ton replacement for M113 with 25 mm, 30 mm or 40 mm AGL
 Bronco ATTC (All Terrain Tracked Carrier)
 Bv206 ATTC with variants
 Terrex AV-81
 Hunter AFV

Self-propelled guns 
 SSPH1 155 mm Computerised Automatic-loading SP gun

Slovenia 
AFVs produced in Slovenia
 LKOV Valuk
 LKOV Krpan

South Africa 

Armoured fighting vehicles designed and produced in South Africa

Tanks

Main battle tanks 
 Olifant Mk1A

Prototype tanks 
 Semel
 Skokiaan

Self propelled artillery 
 G6 howitzer
 Valkiri

Infantry fighting vehicles 
 Ratel
 LM13
 Mbombe

Armoured personnel carriers 
 Buffel
 Casspir
 Hippo
 LM8
 LM14
 Mamba
 Marauder
 Matador
 Maverick
 RCV-9
 Reva
 RG-12
 RG-19
 RG-31 Nyala
 RG-32 Scout
 RG-33
 RG-34
 RG-35
 RG-41
 RG Outrider
 PUMA M26-15

Armoured cars 
 Eland
 Rooikat

South Korea 
AFVs produced in South Korea

Tanks 
 M48A5K
 K1 & K1A1/A2
 K2 Black Panther

Armoured fighting vehicles 
 AAV7A1
 BMP-3
 BTR-80A
 M577
 M113
 M114
 K1 ARV
 K1 AVLB
 K-200 KIFV
 K-200 KAFV
 K21 IFV
 K-532
 KM900
 Doosan Barracuda

Self-propelled artillery 
 K-55 Howitzer
 M107 175 mm SP Howitzer
 M110 203 mm SP Howitzer
 M270A1 MLRS
 K-9 Thunder 155 mm SP Howitzer
 K-136 Kooryong MRLS

Self-propelled air defense 
 K30 Biho
 K263
Crotale (missile) K-SAM

Soviet Union (later Russian Federation) 
AFVs produced in the [ Soviet Union / Russian Federation]

Tanks 
 PT-76
 T-10
 T-54
 T-55
 T-62
 T-64
 T-72
 T-80
T-90
T-14 Armata

Armoured personnel carriers and infantry fighting vehicles 
 BMP-1
 BMP-2
 BMP-3
 BMD-1
 BMD-2
 BMD-3
 BRM-1
 BRDM-1
 BRDM-2
 BRDM-3
 BTR-152
 BTR-40
 BTR-50
 BTR-60
 BTR-70
 BTR-80
 BTR-D
 BTR-90
 MT-LB

Self-propelled artillery 
 2P 406mm
 2S1 122mm
 2S3 Akatsiya 152mm
 2S4 240mm
 2S5 152mm
 2S7 203mm
 2S9 120mm
 2S19 152mm
 2S23 120mm
 ASU-85 85mm

Self-propelled air defense 
 ZSU-57-2
 ZSU-23-4
 2K22 Tunguska
 9K31 Strela-1
 9K35 Strela-10
 9K33 Osa
 Tor missile system

Spain 
AFVs produced in Spain

Tanks 
 Leopardo 2E
 M 60
 AMX 30

Armoured fighting vehicles 
 Centauro VRCC (Vehículo de Reconocimiento y Combate de Caballería)
 VEC-M1

Infantry fighting vehicles 
 Pizarro IFV – codevelopment with Austria ("ASCOD")

Armoured personnel carriers 
 BMR-M1
 LVTP7A1
 Piranha IIIC

Sri Lanka 
AFVs produced in Sri Lanka

Armoured personnel carriers 
 Avalon (MPV)
 Unicorn
 Unibuffel

Sweden 
AFVs produced in Sweden

Tanks 
 Stridsvagn 74 Medium tank
 Stridsvagn 103 S tank
 Ikv 91 Tank destroyer with 90 mm low pressure gun
 Strv 121 Leopard 2A4
 Strv 122 Leopard 2 (Swedish version)

Infantry fighting vehicles 
 Combat Vehicle 90

Self-Propelled Artillery 
 Bandkanon 1
 Archer Artillery System

Armoured Personnel Carriers 
 KP-bil Terrängbil m/42 (SKP and VKP)
 Pbv 301
 Pbv 302
 Bv 308/309
 BvS 10

Other AFVs 
  Pvkv m/43
 Lvkv fm/43
 Ikv 72
  Ikv 102
  Ikv 103
 Pvrbbv 551
 Lvrbbv 701

Switzerland 
AFVs produced in Switzerland

Main battle tanks 
 Pz-87 LEO
 Pz-68
 Pz-61

Armored fighting vehicles 
 Spz2000 (CV9030)
 Piranha I 4×4, 6×6 and 8×8
 Piranha II 4×4, 6×6 and 8×8
 Piranha III 6×6, 8×8 and 10×10
 Piranha IV 8×8
 Piranha V 8×8
 SPz 63

Self-propelled artillery 
 PzHb 88-95 "KAWEST"

Armored reconnaissance vehicles 
 Eagle
 Panzerjäger – 6×6 Mowag Piranha with a TOW missile system

Taiwan 
AFVs produced in Taiwan

Main battle tanks 
 CM-11 Brave Tiger
 CM-12 Tank
 M1A2T (U.S export)

Armored fighting vehicles 
 CM-21 Armored Vehicle
 CM-22 
 CM-23
 CM-27
 CM-32 Armoured Vehicle - 8x8
 V-150S

Thailand 
AFVs produced in Thailand

Infantry fighting vehicles 
 BTR-3E1
 DTI Black widow spider
 DTI 8×8 AAPC
 Panus R-600 8×8
 Chaiseri tiger 1

Other AFVs 
 M113

Self-propelled artillery 
 ATMOS 2000
 Soltam M-71
 M425

Self-propelled air defense 
 Bofors L/60
 Bofors L/70
 M163 Vulcan
 Oerlikon GDF

Wheeled armoured personnel carrier / Mine-resistant ambush protected (MRAP) 
 First Win
 Phantom-380 x

Turkey 
AFVs produced in Turkey

Main battle tanks 
 Altay (tank)
 Leopard 1
 Leopard 2NG
 M60 Patton
 M48 Patton

Armored Combat Vehicle 
 Tulpar (IFV)
 ACV-300

Armored Personnel Carrier 
 Otokar Yavuz
 Otokar Arma 6×6, 8×8
 PARS 4×4, 6×6, 8×8
 Nurol Ejder

Light Armored Personnel Carrier 
 Otokar Akrep
 Otokar Cobra
 Otokar Cobra 2
 Otokar Ural
 Nurol Ejder Yalçın

Mine Resistant Ambush Protected 
 Otokar Kaya
 BMC Kirpi

Multi Purpose Armoured Vehicle 
 BMC MPAV

Self-Propelled Artillery 
 T-155

Ukraine 
AFVs produced in Ukraine

Main battle tanks 
 T-55AGM
 T-64BM2
 T-64U (BM Bulat)
 T-72MP
 T-72AG
 T-72-120
 T-80UD
 T-84
 T-84-120 Yatagan
 BM Oplot

Infantry fighting vehicles 
 BMP-1M/BMP-1U

Armoured personnel carriers 
 BTR-3
 BTR-4
 BTR-94
 Dozor-B

Other AFVs 
 BREM-84

United Kingdom 
AFVs produced in the United Kingdom

Main battle tanks 
 Centurion
 FV4101 Charioteer (200)
 Conqueror Heavy Tank (200)
 Chieftain
 Challenger 1 (420)
 Challenger 2 (408)
 Challenger 3
 Vickers MBT

Infantry fighting vehicles 
 FV510 Warrior

Other AFVs 
 Sabre tracked armoured reconnaissance vehicle (136)
 Shorland armoured car internal security vehicle
 Scorpion tracked armoured reconnaissance vehicle
 Striker tracked Swingfire missile launcher
 Samaritan tracked armoured ambulance
 Sultan tracked armoured command vehicle
 Samson tracked armoured recovery vehicle
 Scimitar tracked armoured reconnaissance vehicle
 Alvis Stormer tracked armoured vehicle family
 Saladin wheeled (6×6) armoured car
 Ferret Scout Car wheeled (4×4) armored car
 FV721 Fox CVR wheeled (4×4) armoured car
 FV 432 AFV tracked armoured personnel carrier variants
 FV222 Conqueror ARV
 Humber Hornet

Self-propelled air defence 
 Tracked Rapier

Self-propelled artillery 
 Abbot FV433 Self-propelled Artillery
 AS90 Self-propelled howitzer

Armoured personnel carriers 
 Saracen
 FV 1611 Humber
 Spartan
 Saxon
 FV 432 AFV

United States 
AFVs produced in the United States.

Tanks

Main battle tanks 
 M46, M47, M48, M60 Patton series
 M103 heavy tank
 M1 Abrams
 M1 Armored Recovery Vehicle (prototype only)
 M1150 Assault Breacher Vehicle (military engineering vehicle)
 M1 CATTB (prototype only)
 M1 Grizzly Combat Mobility Vehicle (prototype only)
 M1 Panther II (mine clearing vehicle)
 M1 Thumper (prototype only)
 M1 TTB (prototype only)
 M1IP
 M1A1
 M1A1AIM v.1
 M1A1AIM v.2
 M1A1FEP
 M1A1D
 M1A1HA
 M1A1HC
 M1A1KVT
 M1A1M (Republic of Iraq export variant)
 M1A1SA (Kingdom of Morocco export variant)
 M1A2
 M1A2S (Kingdom of Saudi Arabia export variant)
 M1A2 SEPv1
 M1A2 SEPv2
 M1A2 SEPv3
 M1A2 SEPv4
 M104 Wolverine Heavy Assault Bridge
 XM1-FSED (prototype only)

Light tanks 
 M24 Chaffee Light Tank
 M41 Walker Bulldog Light Tank
 M132 Armored Flamethrower
 M551 Sheridan Light/Airmobile Tank
 M901 Improved TOW Vehicle
 Stingray light tank

Infantry fighting vehicles 
 M2 Bradley Infantry Fighting Vehicle
 BCT Ground Combat Vehicle (Cancelled Feb 2014. Intended to replace the M113 by 2018 and the Bradley)
 Optionally Manned Fighting Vehicle

Armored reconnaissance vehicle 
 LAV-25
 Lynx reconnaissance vehicle
 Cadillac Gage Commando

Cavalry fighting vehicles 
 M3 Bradley Cavalry Fighting Vehicle

Armored personnel carriers 
 M75 armored personnel carrier
 M59 armored personnel carrier
 M113 armored personnel carrier
 M114 armored fighting vehicle
 LVTP7/AAVP7A1 amphibious armored carrier
 Stryker (co-produced in Canada)
 Armored Multi-Purpose Vehicle

Self-propelled artillery 
 M56 howitzer
 M50 Ontos Self-Propelled Rifle
 M107 175 mm SP Howitzer
 M108 105 mm SP Howitzer
 M109 155 mm SP Howitzer
 M110 203 mm SP Howitzer
 M84 Mortar
 M1128 Mobile Gun System
 M109L
 M1299 155mm SP Howitzer

Self-propelled air defense 
 M42 40 mm Self-Propelled Anti-Aircraft Gun
 M163 Vulcan Air Defense System
 M247 Sgt. York DIVAD
 M6 Bradley Linebacker SHORAD
 M730 Chaparral Self-propelled SAM launcher
M167 VADS

Engineering support vehicles 
 M56 Coyote
 Caterpillar D9 armored bulldozer

Mine-resistant ambush protected vehicles (MRAPs) 
 Buffalo
 Caiman
 Casspir
 Cougar
 M1117
 MaxxPro
 Oshkosh L-ATV
 Oshkosh M-ATV
 Osprea Mamba
 RG-33
 MaxxPro

Vietnam 
AFVs produced in Vietnam.

Infantry fighting vehicles 

 XCB-01

Amphibious armoured personnel carriers 

 XTC-02

Zimbabwe 
AFVs produced in Zimbabwe

Armoured Personnel Carriers 
 Crocodile Armoured Personnel Carrier
 MAP45 Armoured Personnel Carrier
 MAP75 Armoured Personnel Carrier

Infantry fighting vehicles 
 Mine Protected Combat Vehicle – MPCV
 Bullet TCV (prototype only)
 Gazelle FRV (prototype only)

See also 
 List of armoured fighting vehicles
 List of military vehicles
 List of armoured fighting vehicles by country

Notes

References 
 
 
 

modern